Doddington and Harby railway station is a former railway station on the Nottinghamshire border with Lincolnshire, England.

Context
The station was opened in March 1897 by the Lancashire, Derbyshire and East Coast Railway on its main line from Chesterfield to Lincoln.

The station served the rural villages of Doddington and Harby on either side of the county boundary.

It was closed to passengers by British Railways in 1955, although goods continued to be handled until 30 March 1964.

The stationmaster's house was built in the distinctive LD&ECR style, as can be seen in the accompanying photograph. The station buildings were also built in the company's style, which had clear echoes at Arkwright Town, Bolsover South and Warsop, to name but three.

Former services
There never was a Sunday service at Doddington and Harby.

In 1922, three trains per day plied between Chesterfield Market Place and Lincoln, with a market day extra on Fridays between Langwith Junction and Lincoln. All these trains called at Doddington and Harby.

From 1951 trains stopped running through to Chesterfield, turning back at Langwith Junction instead. Otherwise the same pattern continued until the last train on 19 September 1955.

Trains continued to pass, including summer excursions which continued until 1964, but the picture was one of progressive decline. A derailment at Clifton-on-Trent on 21 February 1980 led to the immediate closure of the line from High Marnham Power Station through the station to Pyewipe Junction. These tracks were subsequently lifted.

Modern times
Today the trackbed eastwards from the site of Fledborough Station, across Fledborough Viaduct, through Clifton-on-Trent to Doddington and Harby forms an off-road part of National Cycle Route 647 which is part of the National Cycle Network.

From Doddington and Harby onwards through the site of Skellingthorpe almost to Pyewipe Junction the trackbed forms an off-road part of National Cycle Route 64.

References

Sources

Further reading

External links
Doddington and Harby Station on old OS map npe Maps

Disused railway stations in Nottinghamshire
Former Lancashire, Derbyshire and East Coast Railway stations
Railway stations in Great Britain opened in 1897
Railway stations in Great Britain closed in 1955